Veranus may refer to:
Veranus of Vence (died 480), Bishop of Vence and saint
Veranus of Cavaillon (died 590),  Bishop of Cavaillon and saint